Goodenia kingiana is a species of flowering plant in the family Goodeniaceae and is endemic to Western Australia. It is an erect shrub with deeply-lobed or divided leaves and racemes or thyrses of yellow flowers.

Description

Taxonomy and naming
Goodenia kingiana was first formally described in 1990 by Roger Charles Carolin in the journal Telopea from material collected by Nathaniel Speck, east of Kalli in 1965. The specific epithet (kingiana) honours Henry Sandford King who first collected this species.

Distribution and habitat
This goodenia grows at the base of laterite breakaways near Cue in the Murchison and Yalgoo biogeographic regions of Western Australia.

Conservation status
Goodenia kingiana is classified as "not threatened" by the Department of Environment and Conservation (Western Australia).

References

kingiana
Eudicots of Western Australia
Plants described in 1990
Taxa named by Roger Charles Carolin
Endemic flora of Western Australia